Marjorie Jill Pettis (born 22 September 1952) is a New Zealand politician, and a member of the Labour Party.

Biography

Early life
Pettis was born on 22 September 1952. Before entering politics, she worked as a nurse and as a finance officer at a bank. Pettis is of Māori descent.

Political career

Pettis became a member of the Labour Party in 1968.

Pettis became MP for Wanganui in the 1993 election, but in 2005 she narrowly lost the seat to National's Chester Borrows. She was returned to Parliament as a list MP, at which point she stepped down as the Labour Party's Senior Whip to focus on winning back the Whanganui seat.

She also served as Assistant Speaker of the House.

She retired from politics prior to the 2008 general election.

Personal life 
Pettis is married with two children.

References

External links
Page on Parliamentary website

1952 births
Living people
New Zealand Labour Party MPs
New Zealand nurses
Women members of the New Zealand House of Representatives
New Zealand list MPs
New Zealand MPs for North Island electorates
Unsuccessful candidates in the 1990 New Zealand general election
Members of the New Zealand House of Representatives
New Zealand women nurses
21st-century New Zealand politicians
21st-century New Zealand women politicians
Māori MPs